Pimsleur may refer to:

 Paul Pimsleur, an applied linguistics researcher
 Pimsleur Language Programs, a language learning company
 Pimsleur Language Aptitude Battery, a test for predicting success in foreign language acquisition